Poshtkuh (also Romanized as Poshtkūh; also known as Khar Posht and Posht Kūh-e Khar Posht) is a village in Aliabad Rural District, in the Central District of Anbarabad County, Kerman Province, Iran. At the 2006 census, its population was 104, in 21 families.

References 

Populated places in Anbarabad County